Alexandra Fuller (born in 1969 in Glossop, England) is a British-Rhodesian author. Her articles and reviews have appeared in The New Yorker, National Geographic, Granta, The New York Times, The Guardian and The Financial Times.

Personal life 
In 1972 Fuller moved with her family to Rhodesia (now Zimbabwe). She was educated at boarding schools in Umtali and Salisbury (renamed Harare after 1982). She met her American husband, Charlie Ross, in Zambia, where he was running a rafting business for tourists. In 1994, they moved to his home state of Wyoming.  Fuller and Ross divorced in 2012. They have three children. She currently spends much of her time in a yurt near Jackson, Wyoming.

Books
Her first book -- Don't Let's Go to the Dogs Tonight -- (published in 2001; a memoir of life with her family living in southern Africa) won the Winifred Holtby Memorial Prize in 2002. In the same year it was featured in The New York Times list of "Notable Books" and a finalist for The Guardian First Book Award. Her second book -- Scribbling the Cat (published in 2004 about war's repercussions) received the Lettre Ulysses Award for the Art of Reportage in 2005.

In Fuller's third book, The Legend of Colton H. Bryant (2008), she narrates the short life of a Wyoming roughneck who fell to his death at age 25 in February 2006 on an oil rig owned by Patterson–UTI Energy. A second memoir, Cocktail Hour Under The Tree of Forgetfulness (2011), is about her mother, Nicola Fuller. Leaving Before the Rains Come, published in January 2015, is about the disintegration of Fuller's marriage.

Fuller published her first novel, Quiet Until the Thaw, on 27 June 2017.

Education 
Fuller received a B.A. from Acadia University in Nova Scotia, Canada. In 2007 she received an Honorary Doctorate of Letters from the same institution.

Don't Let's Go to the Dogs Tonight

The memoir follows Fuller, called Bobo by her family, and her sister and parents as they move from England to Rhodesia and other points in Central Africa. The book mainly focuses on stories of family life while moving around Rhodesia (now Zimbabwe), Malawi and Zambia. The Rhodesian Bush War, or Second Chimurenga, serves as a backdrop to the family's time in Rhodesia. After the Rhodesian Bush War, the Fullers move to Malawi and then Zambia.

Fuller recalls comic stories about her mother getting drunk at dinner and staying up all night, but does not hide the effect her mother's alcoholism had on her childhood. Fuller writes about living through a war, being white while growing up in an almost all-black country, and the death of siblings and beloved animals.

Works
 Cocktail Hour under the Tree of Forgetfulness, Waterville, Me.: Thorndike 2011. , 
 Scribbling the Cat: Travels with an African Soldier, London: Picador, 2004. , 
 Don't Let's Go to the Dogs Tonight: an African childhood, London: Picador, 2015. , 
 Leaving Before the Rains Come. ULVERSCROFT, 2017. ,

See also
 Whites in Zimbabwe
 British diaspora in Africa

References

External links

Official Website 
 Powells.com Author interview
Sketchy biography as winner of the Lettre Ulysses Award
 – The New York Times article on Hell's Backbone Grill, Boulder, Utah.

1969 births
Living people
21st-century English memoirists
21st-century English novelists
21st-century English women writers
21st-century Zimbabwean writers
21st-century Zimbabwean women writers
People from Glossop
Zimbabwean memoirists
Zimbabwean people of English descent
English emigrants to the United States
Acadia University alumni
Zimbabwean exiles
British women memoirists
Writers about Africa
British emigrants to Rhodesia
White Rhodesian people
British expatriates in Zambia
British expatriates in Malawi